Tintina is a rock on the surface of Aeolis Palus, between Peace Vallis and Aeolis Mons (Mount Sharp), in Gale crater on the planet Mars.  The approximate site coordinates are: .

The rock was encountered by the Curiosity rover on the way from Bradbury Landing to Glenelg Intrigue in January 2013. The rover ran over the rock and broke it. revealing white surface area in the rock. This was the brightest material yet seen by MastCam up to that time.

When the broken white area was analyzed with the rover's MastCam, strong signals of mineral hydration, as indicated by a ratio of near infrared reflectance intensities, were found.  According to mission scientists, the mineral hydration signals were consistent with hydrated calcium sulfate, and a watery past on Mars.

See also

 Aeolis quadrangle 
 Composition of Mars 
 Geology of Mars
 List of rocks on Mars
 Timeline of Mars Science Laboratory

References

External links
 Curiosity Rover – Official Site

Aeolis quadrangle
Mars Science Laboratory
Rocks on Mars